The following is a list of notable events and releases that happened in Scandinavian music in 2020. (Go to last year in Scandinavian music or next year in Scandinavian music.)

Events

January
1 January – The 2020 season of Denmark's X Factor competition is launched.
16 January – The Royal Swedish Opera appoints Alan Gilbert as its next music director; his tenure will begin in spring 2021.
28 January – Mia Winter Wallace announces that she has left Abbath.
30 January – The Léonie Sonning Music Prize is awarded to Unsuk Chin.

February
9 February – Icelandic composer Hildur Guðnadóttir becomes the first woman for twenty years, and only the fourth of all time, to win the Academy Award for Best Original Score, which is awarded for her score for Joker.
29 February – The Söngvakeppnin final, held in Reykjavik, is won by Gagnamagnið with the song "Think About Things". The winners do not go on to represent Iceland in the Eurovision Song Contest because of the COVID-19 pandemic that causes the whole contest to be cancelled.

March
7 March
The Dansk Melodi Grand Prix 2020 is held in Copenhagen, hosted by Hella Joof and Rasmus Bjerg, but without a live audience as a result of the COVID-19 pandemic in Denmark
Aksel Kankaanranta wins the Uuden Musiikin Kilpailu and is selected as Finland's representative in the 2020 Eurovision Song Contest (later cancelled), with the song "Looking Back".
16 March – Alexi Laiho and Daniel Freyberg announce the formation of a new heavy metal supergroup, Bodom After Midnight, also including drummer Waltteri Vayrynen and bassist Mitja Toivonen.
22 March – Guitarist Niklas Sundin announces that he is leaving Swedish metal band Dark Tranquillity.
30 March – Finnish band Dark the Suns announce they are re-forming by releasing a preview of their new single.

April
23 April – Norwegian singer Sigrid is among those participating in the recording of a charity single, "Times Like These", by the "Live Lounge Allstars". The single goes to no 1 in the UK charts and does well in other European and North American charts.

May
14 May – The final of Sveriges 12:a, a one-off music competition in the Eurovision format, is broadcast in Sweden by Sveriges Television. The winner is Icelandic band Daði og Gagnamagnið, performing "Think About Things" in English, which had been intended as Iceland's entry for the cancelled Eurovision Song Contest.
16 May – In a special vote, BBC viewers select ABBA's 1974 Eurovision-winning song, "Waterloo", as the best Eurovision song of all time.
29 May – John Lundvik wins Swedish TV's Let's Dance 2020 series.

September
4 September – Finnish conductor Santtu-Matias Rouvali's first recording with the Philharmonia Orchestra is released: Swan Lake, a year before he takes up his appointment as the orchestra's Principal Conductor.
22 September – Sweden's Idol contestant Caspar Camitz tests positive for COVID-19 and has to drop out of the first performance. Three days later another contestant, Herman Silow, also tests positive, and the following day so does Indra Elg.
30 September – Despite rumours that Sveriges Television have asked him to return, it is confirmed that David Sundin will not be a host at the 2021 Melodifestivalen.

December
December 4 – The Idol 2020 final in Sweden was won by Nadja Holm. It was held at the studios in Spånga for the first time since 2006, because of the COVID restrictions.
December 19 – The final of the 2020 series of Finnish TV series Vain elämää is scheduled to take place.

Albums released

January

February

March

April

May

June

July

August

September

October

November

December

Eurovision Song Contest
 Denmark in the Eurovision Song Contest 2020
 Finland in the Eurovision Song Contest 2020
 Iceland in the Eurovision Song Contest 2020
 Norway in the Eurovision Song Contest 2020
 Sweden in the Eurovision Song Contest 2020

Classical works
 Hildur Guðnadóttir – Illimani
 Anders Hillborg – Through Lost Landscapes
 Bent Sørensen – Enchantress (5 intermezzi for orchestra)

Film and television scores
Lasse Enerson – Cold Courage
Marcus Paus - Mortal

Deaths
3 January – Bo Winberg, 80, Swedish guitarist (The Spotnicks)
26 January – Santtu Lonka, 41, Finnish former drummer of To/Die/For
6 February – Ola Magnell, 74, Swedish singer and guitarist
9 February – Margareta Hallin, 88, Swedish opera singer, composer and actress
18 February – Jon Christensen, 76, Norwegian jazz drummer
27 February – Jahn Teigen, 70, Norwegian singer internationally known for his performance in the 1978 Eurovision Song Contest
3 March – Alf Cranner, 83, Norwegian folk singer
28 March – Kerstin Behrendtz, 69, radio presenter and music director (COVID-19)
14 April – Kerstin Meyer, 92, Swedish mezzo-soprano.
3 May – Bob Lander, 78, Swedish rock musician (The Spotnicks)
5 May – Kjell Karlsen, 88, Norwegian composer and bandleader.
20 May – Malin Gjörup, 56, Swedish operatic mezzo-soprano and actress (cerebral haemorrhage) 
21 May – Berith Bohm, 87, Swedish opera singer
 7 June – Edith Thallaug, 90, Norwegian mezzo-soprano and actress  
 3 June – Helge Rykkja, 76, poet and lyricist
27 June – Mats Rådberg, 72, Swedish singer
12 July – Jarno Sarkula, 47, Finnish musician (Alamaailman Vasarat)
22 August – Ulla Pia, 75, Danish singer
6 September – Anita Lindblom, 82, Swedish singer and actress
8 September – Vexi Salmi, 77, Finnish lyricist
29 October – Alexander Vedernikov, 56, Russian chief conductor of the Royal Danish Opera (COVID)
26 November – Allan Botschinsky, 80, Danish jazz trumpeter
19 December – , 60, Swedish drummer (Roxette).
24 December – Roland Cedermark, 82, Swedish singer
29 December – Gösta Linderholm, 79, Swedish singer and composer
December – Alexi Laiho, 41, Finnish guitarist, composer, and vocalist

References

Scandinavian
Scandinavian culture